The Military ranks of Romania are the military insignia used by the Romanian Armed Forces.

Branch colors in the Romanian Armed Forces 

The colors depend on the service branch (literally "weapon") the bearer is a member of. They show on the shoulder slides which hold the rank insignia, on the band of combination caps, and on collar insignia. Because many different branches share a color (for example black or light blue), each branch has distinctive branch insignia, which is worn next to the rank insignia on the shoulder slides. Other militarized institutions, such as the Romanian Gendarmerie and the Military Firefighters Corps, also have branch insignia worn in the same way.

The same ranks and basic insignia are used in the other militarised institutions. They differ in the color and branch insignia on the shoulder boards.
 Gendarmerie
 Firefighters
 General Inspectorate of Aviation
 Intelligence Service
 Foreign Intelligence Service
 Protection and Guard Service
 Special Telecommunications Service

Armed forces

Commissioned officer ranks
The rank insignia of commissioned officers.

Other ranks
The rank insignia of non-commissioned officers and enlisted personnel.

Warrant officers ranks

Gendarmerie 
Unlike the Romanian Police, the Gendarmerie is a military force, and uses the same ranking system as the Romanian Land Forces.

Commissioned officer ranks
The rank insignia of commissioned officers.

Other ranks
The rank insignia of non-commissioned officers and enlisted personnel.

Military firefighters corps

Commissioned officer ranks
The rank insignia of commissioned officers.

Other ranks
The rank insignia of non-commissioned officers and enlisted personnel.

See also 
 Military ranks of the Kingdom of Romania
 Military ranks of the Socialist Republic of Romania

References

External links 
 

Ranks
Armed Forces
Romania